Radějovice is a municipality and village in Strakonice District in the South Bohemian Region of the Czech Republic. It has about 40 inhabitants.

References

Villages in Strakonice District